Zamboanga City's at-large congressional district is an obsolete congressional district that encompassed the entire Zamboanga City prior to its 2004 reapportionment that took effect in 2007. It existed from 1984 to 2007, when Zamboanga elected a representative city-wide at-large to the Batasang Pambansa and to the restored House of Representatives. Before 1984 when it was granted its own seat in the regular Batasan assembly as a highly-urbanized city, Zamboanga was represented as part of the multi-member Region IX's at-large assembly district for the Interim Batasang Pambansa and was also earlier included in Zamboanga del Sur's at-large congressional district for the Third Philippine Republic congresses. It was last represented by Erico Basilio Fabian of the Laban ng Demokratikong Pilipino (LDP).

Representation history

See also
Legislative districts of Zamboanga City

References

Former congressional districts of the Philippines
Politics of Zamboanga City
1984 establishments in the Philippines
1986 disestablishments in the Philippines
1987 establishments in the Philippines
2004 disestablishments in the Philippines
At-large congressional districts of the Philippines
Congressional districts of Zamboanga Peninsula
Constituencies established in 1984
Constituencies established in 2004